Luís Pimenta may refer to:
Luís Pimenta (football manager) (born 1981), Portuguese football manager
Luís Pimenta (footballer, born 1986), Portuguese football forward